A timberclad warship is a kind of mid 19th century river gunboat.

They were based upon a similar design as ironclad warships but had timber in place of iron to act as ablative armour.

See also
Cottonclad warship
Battle of Fort Henry
USS Conestoga (1861)
USS Essex (1856)
USS Lexington (1861)
USS Tyler (1857)

References

Further reading

External links
Civil War Warship Types
Federal Warships in Tennessee

Ship types